The Old Parish Church of Peebles is one of several Christian churches in Peebles, Borders, Scotland.  It is a congregation of the Church of Scotland.  Dedicated on 29 March 1887, it lies at the end of the High Street.

The church was constructed between 1885 and 1887 at a cost of £9,500. It includes some features from an earlier parish church built on the site in 1784. The architect was William Young of London who designed the church in a Gothic style.

The church is a member of Peebles Churches Together.

References

External links
 
 Peebles Churches Together

Churches completed in 1887
19th-century Church of Scotland church buildings
Tweeddale
Churches in the Scottish Borders
Category B listed buildings in the Scottish Borders
Listed churches in Scotland
Gothic Revival church buildings in Scotland
Church of Scotland churches in Scotland
1887 establishments in Scotland
Peebles